Peggy Regenwetter (born 16 February 1971) is a Luxembourgian table tennis player. She competed in women's doubles at the 2000 Summer Olympics in Sydney.

References

External links

1971 births
Living people
Luxembourgian female table tennis players
Olympic table tennis players of Luxembourg
Table tennis players at the 2000 Summer Olympics